The 2020 New Hampshire Senate elections took place as part of the biennial 2020 United States elections. New Hampshire voters elected state senators in all of the state's 24 senate districts. State senators serve two-year terms in the New Hampshire Senate, with all of the seats up for election each cycle. The primary elections on September 8, 2020, determined which candidates will appear on the November 3, 2020, general election ballot.

Following the 2018 election, Democrats had control of the New Hampshire Senate with 14 seats to Republicans' 10 seats. Following the 2020 election, the Republicans flipped four seats and thus control of the chamber alongside flipping the New Hampshire House of Representatives.

Composition

Summary

Close races

Outgoing incumbents

Retiring
Martha Hennessey (D–Hanover), representing District 5 since 2016, announced in May 2020 that she would be retiring at the end of her term to spend more time with her family.
Martha Fuller Clark (D–Portsmouth), representing District 21 since 2012 (and from 2004 to 2010), announced in May 2020 that she would be retiring from the legislature.

Seeking another office
Dan Feltes (D–Concord), representing District 15 since 2014, is not seeking reelection to the Senate in order to run for governor of New Hampshire. Feltes won the primary and faced incumbent Chris Sununu in the general election.

Defeated in primary
David Starr (R–Franconia), representing District 1 since 2018, was defeated in the Republican primary by New Hampshire House of Representatives member Erin Hennessey.

Predictions

Detailed results

District 1

Candidates
Republican
David Starr, incumbent state senator since 2018
Erin Hennessey, incumbent state representative for Grafton District 4 since 2014
Democratic
Susan Ford, incumbent state representative for Grafton District 3 since 2018

Results
Republican primary

General election

District 2

Candidates
Republican
Bob Giuda, incumbent state senator since 2016, former state representative for Grafton District 4 and District 5 from 2000-2006
David DeVoy, U.S. Army veteran and gas station owner
Democratic
Bill Bolton, retired state employee and Plymouth Select Board Chair

Results
Republican primary

General election

District 3

Candidates
Republican
Democratic
Theresa Swanick, Effingham elected official and candidate for state representative in Carroll District 5 in 2016 and 2018

Results

District 4

Candidates
Democratic
David H. Watters, incumbent state senator since 2012
Republican
Frank Bertone, former Libertarian candidate for state representative Strafford District 4 in 2018

Results

District 5

Candidates
Democratic
Beatriz Pastor, former state representative for Grafton District 12 (2008-2014)
Sue Prentiss, former Lebanon Mayor, current Lebanon councilwoman and paramedic
Republican
Timothy O'Hearne

Results
Democratic primary

General election

District 6

Candidates
Republican
James Gray, incumbent state senator since 2016
Democratic
Christopher Rice, Rochester councilman

Results

District 7

Candidates
Republican
Harold F. French, incumbent state senator since 2016
Democratic
Philip Spagnuolo Jr., former state representative for Belknap District 3 (February–December 2018)

Results

District 8

Candidates
Republican
Ruth Ward, incumbent state senator since 2016
Democratic
Jenn Alford-Teaster, researcher and candidate for District 8 in 2018

Results

District 9

Candidates
Democratic
Jeanne Dietsch, incumbent state senator since 2018
Republican
Denise Ricciardi, Bedford councilwoman

Results

District 10

Candidates
Democratic
Jay Kahn, incumbent state senator since 2016
Republican
Dan LeClair, businessman and candidate for District 10 in 2018.

Results

District 11

Candidates
Democratic
Shannon Chandley, incumbent state senator since 2018
Republican
Gary Daniels, former state senator from District 11 (2016-2018)

Results

District 12

Candidates
Democratic
Melanie Levesque, incumbent state senator since 2018
Republican
Kevin Avard, former state senator from District 12 (2014-2018)

Results

District 13

Candidates
Democratic
Cindy Rosenwald, incumbent state senator since 2018
Republican
Mariellen MacKay, former Democratic state representative for Hillsborough District 30 (2012-2018), Republican candidate for Hillsborough District 30 in 2018

Results

District 14

Candidates
Republican
Sharon Carson, incumbent state senator since 2008, former President pro tempore  of the New Hampshire Senate (2014-2018)
Democratic
Nancy Hendricks, former Londonderry School Board chair

Results

District 15

Candidates
Democratic
Candace Bouchard, former Concord councilwoman and former state representative for Merrimack District 18 (1998-2014)
Becky Whitley, lawyer and activist
Republican
Linda Rae Banfill, candidate for Concord Mayor 2019

Results
Democratic primary

General election

District 16

Candidates
Democratic
Kevin Cavanaugh, incumbent state senator since 2017
Republican
Jason Syversen, businessman

Results

District 17

Candidates
Republican
John Reagan, incumbent state senator since 2012
Janet DelFuoco, witch
Democratic
Nancy Fraher, state senate candidate for District 17 in 2014 and 2016

Results
Republican primary

General election

District 18

Candidates
Democratic
Donna Soucy, incumbent state senator since 2012, incumbent Senate President since December 2018
Republican
George Lambert, former state representative for Hillsborough District 44 (2010-2014), former candidate for Governor (2014), candidate for District 18 in 2018.
Ross Terrio, former Manchester School Board member (2013-2020), former state representative for Hillsborough District 14 (2010-2012)

Results
Republican primary

General election

District 19

Candidates
Republican
Regina Birdsell, incumbent state senator since 2014
Democratic
Joshua Bourdon, Derry councilman

Results

District 20

Candidates
Democratic
Lou D'Allesandro, incumbent state senator since 1998
Republican
Carla Gericke, candidate for District 20 in 2016 and 2018
Jack Kenny

Results
Republican primary

General election

District 21

Candidates
Democratic
Deaglan McEachern, Portsmouth councilman
Rebecca Perkins Kwoka, Portsmouth councilwoman
Republican
Sue Polidura, historian

Results
Democratic primary

General election

District 22

Candidates
Republican
Chuck Morse, incumbent state senator since 2010 (and also from 2002-2006) and former Senate President (2013-2018). Minority leader since 2018
Democratic
Thomas Haynes, retired

Results

District 23

Candidates
Democratic
Jon Morgan, incumbent state senator since 2018
Republican
Allen Cook, former state representative for Rockingham District 11 (2014-2018)
Bill Gannon, former state senator for District 23 (2016-2018)

Results
Republican primary

General election

District 24

Candidates
Democratic
Tom Sherman, incumbent state senator since 2018
Republican
Regina Barnes, Hampton Board of Selectmen member
Louis Gargiulo, 2016 Republican National Convention delegate from New Hampshire

Results
Republican primary

General election

See also
 2020 New Hampshire elections
 2020 United States elections
 New Hampshire Senate
 Elections in New Hampshire

References

External links
 
 
  (State affiliate of the U.S. League of Women Voters)
 

Senate
New Hampshire Senate elections
New Hampshire Senate